The 2019–20 UIC Flames men's basketball team represented the University of Illinois at Chicago in the 2019–20 NCAA Division I men's basketball season. The Flames, led by fifth-year head coach Steve McClain, played their home games at Credit Union 1 Arena in Chicago, Illinois as members of the Horizon League. The finished the season 18–17, 10–8 in Horizon League to play to finish in a tie for fourth place. As the No. 4 seed in the Horizon League tournament, they defeated IUPUI, Youngstown State, and top-seeded Wright State to advance to the championship game. There they lost to Northern Kentucky.

Shortly after the season, the school announced that head coach Steve McClain would not return as coach of the Flames. A couple of weeks later, the school named Texas assistant coach Luke Yaklich as the Flames' new coach.

Previous season
The Flames finished the 2018–19 season 16–16 overall, 10–8 in Horizon League play to finish in a tie for fourth place. In the Horizon League tournament, they were defeated by Green Bay in the quarterfinals.

Roster

Schedule and results

|-
!colspan=12 style=| Exhibition

|-
!colspan=12 style=| Non-conference regular season

|-
!colspan=9 style=| Horizon League regular season

|-
!colspan=12 style=| Horizon League tournament
|-

|-

Source

References

UIC Flames men's basketball seasons
UIC Flames
UIC Flames men's basketball
UIC Flames men's basketball